Live in Paris 1992 is a live album by American jazz pianist Ahmad Jamal featuring performances recorded in Colombes in 1992 and released on the Birdology label.

Critical reception
In his review for AllMusic, Scott Yanow states: "Ahmad Jamal's style has become more extroverted and virtuosic since his early days in the 1950s, and his performances with his trio are often more dramatic. However the pianist is still a master at using space and dynamics, interacting closely with his sidemen, and creating music that builds slowly in intensity. His Paris concert from 1992 is an excellent example of his more recent work".

Track listing
All compositions by Ahmad Jamal unless noted.
 "The Tube" – 7:53
 "Alone Together/Laura/Wild Is the Wind" (Arthur Schwartz, Howard Dietz/David Raksin, Johnny Mercer/Dimitri Tiomkin, Ned Washington) – 7:09
 "Caravan" (Duke Ellington, Irving Mills, Juan Tizol) – 5:19
 "Easy Living" (Ralph Rainger, Leo Robin) – 6:27
 "Acorn" – 8:41
 "Dreamy" (Erroll Garner) – 7:13
 "Appreciation" (Johnny Pate) – 5:16
 "Look for the Silver Lining" (Buddy DeSylva, Jerome Kern) – 3:08
 "The Aftermath" – 5:08

Personnel
Ahmad Jamal – piano
James Cammack – bass (tracks 1–5,7 & 9)
Todd Coolman – bass (track 6)
David Bowler – drums (tracks 1–5, 7, & 9)
Gordon Lane – drums (track 6)

References 

Verve Records live albums
Ahmad Jamal live albums
1993 live albums